Scopula mesophaena is a moth of the  family Geometridae. It is found in Kenya.

References

Endemic moths of Kenya
Moths described in 1923
mesophaena
Moths of Africa